The Skaraborg Regiment, designation I 9, was a Swedish Army infantry regiment that traced its origins back to the 16th century. It was converted to an armoured regiment in 1942. The regiment's soldiers were recruited from Skaraborg County, and it was later garrisoned there.

History
The regiment has its origins in fänikor raised in Skaraborg County in the 16th century. The oldest preserved documents dealing with fänikor and foot soldiers in Skaraborg County are from 1543. Of the fänikor from Västergötland and Dalsland, in 1613 a grand regiment of 3,000 men was formed. Sometime between 1621 and 1624, the grand regiment was permanently split into three smaller field regiments which formed the basis for Skaraborg Regiment, Älvsborg Regiment and Halland Regiment. Skaraborg Regiment got Bengt Pilefeldt as its first commander. The regiment was mentioned in the Instrument of Government of 1634 as Det Andre Wästgöthe Regemente, där under hörer Scharaborgz Lähn ("The second Västgöta regiment, which includes Skaraborg County"). The regiment was allotted in 1684. It was roterat (an old feudal method of recruiting) with 1,200 numbers (soldiers) in Skaraborg County. From 1696 to 1913 the regiment trained on Axevalla heath. In 1913, it moved to new barracks in Skövde. The regiment received an armored battalion in 1939 and was reorganized in 1942 into an armored regiment, giving it the name Skaraborg Armoured Regiment (P 4).

Organisation 

1684(?)
Livkompaniet
Överstelöjtnantens kompani
Majorens kompani
Vartofta kompani
Skåninge kompani
Kåkinds kompani
Willska kompani
Norra Wassbo kompani

1854(?)
Livkompaniet
Höjentorps kompani
Vartofta kompani
Vilska kompani
Södra Vadsbo kompani
Norra Vadsbo kompani
Kåkinds kompani
Skånings kompani

Heraldry and traditions

Colours, standards and guidons
When the regiment was reorganized into an armoured unit, the colour from the time as an infantry unit was kept. The colour was of the 1844 model, and had been presented on 24 June 1858 by Crown Prince Carl Ludvig Eugen (later Charles XV), then in the form of two battalion colours. The colour originally had only two battle honours, Lützen (1632) and Malatitze (1708). After further investigations, the regiment was admitted in 1929 on the colour of the 2nd Battalion add six battle honours; Varberg (1565), Narva (1581), Leipzig (1642), Warsaw (1656), Lund (1676) and Landskrona (1677). Until 1994, the regimental colour was the oldest in use when it was replaced by a new colour.

Medals

Commanding officers
Regimental commanders active at the regiment during the years 1634–1709 and 1709–1942. For regimental commanders after 1942, see Skaraborg Regiment (armoured).

1634–1638: Bengt Persson Pilefelt (1631)
1639–1648: Peder Lindormsson Ribbing af Zernava 
1648–1656: Johan Nern 
1656–1665: Johan Hård af Segerstad
1665–1679: Henrik Fredrik von Börstell 
1679–1688: Gustaf Hård af Segerstad 
1688–1705: Nils Brattman Stromberg 
1706–1709: Casper Otto Sperling 
1709–1709: Carl Gustaf Ulfsparre af Broxvik 
1709–1717: Georg Witting
1717–1720: Sven Lagerberg 
1720–1729: Hans Henrik von Essen 
1729–1737: Gustaf Gadde 
1737–1738: Hans Georg Mörner af Morlanda 
1739–1743: Carl Henrik Wrangel af Adinal 
1744–1748: Anton Adolf af Wasaborg 
1748–1748: Fredrik Henrik Sparre 
1748–1750: Carl Magnus de Laval 
1750–1762: Carl von Otter 
1762–1772: Fabian Casimir Wrede af Elimä 
1772–1790: Pehr Scheffer 
1791–1796: Wilhelm Mauritz Pauli 
1796–1808: Carl Johan Gyllenhaal 
1808–1809: Carl Mörner af Tuna 
1809–1816: Carl Henrik Posse af Säby
1816–1836: Christer Posse af Säby 
1837–1844: Magnus von Rosen 
1845–1858: Sebastian Carl von Knorring 
1858–1864: Adolf Ludvig de Maré 
1864–1879: Alexander Johan Wästfelt 
1879–1882: Axel Ryding 
1882–1885: Gustaf Fredrik Snoilsky 
1885–1893: Oscar Theodor Fåhraeus 
1893–1898: Gustaf d´Albedyhll 
1898–1906: Oscar Alfred Wäsfelt
1906–1909: Carl Axel Örn
1909–1916: Axel Carleson
1916–1919: Daniel Magnus Fredrik Björkman
1919–1922: Tell Schmidt
1922–1931: Carl Pehr Pontus Reuterswärd
1931–1935: Carl Uggla
1935–1942: Arthur Nordensvan

Names, designations and locations

See also
Skaraborg Regiment
List of Swedish infantry regiments

Footnotes

References

Notes

Print

Further reading

Infantry regiments of the Swedish Army
Disbanded units and formations of Sweden
Military units and formations established in 1624
Military units and formations disestablished in 1709
Military units and formations established in 1709
Military units and formations disestablished in 1942
1624 establishments in Sweden
1709 disestablishments in Sweden
1709 establishments in Sweden
1942 disestablishments in Sweden
Skövde Garrison